"Morir de amor" is a 1978 hit song by José Luis Perales writes for Miguel Bosé, from his sixth album Miguel. The song is one of the singer's  signature broken heart tunes. The song begins "Morir de amor, despacio y en silencio".

References

1980 songs
Miguel Bosé songs